The six point movement was a movement in East Pakistan, spearheaded by Sheikh Mujibur Rahman, which was called for greater autonomy for East Pakistan. The movement's main agenda was to realize the six demands put forward by a coalition of Bengali nationalist political parties in 1966, to end the perceived exploitation of East Pakistan by the West Pakistani rulers. It is considered a milestone on the road to Bangladesh's independence.

Background
Opposition leaders in East  Pakistan called for a national conference on 6 February 1966, to assess the trend of post-Tashkent politics. On 4 February, Sheikh Mujibur Rahman, along with some members of the Awami League, reached Lahore to attend the conference. The next day on 5 February, he placed the Six  Points before the subject committee and urged to include the issue in the agenda of next day's conference. The proposal was rejected and Sheikh Mujibur Rahman was identified as a separatist. On 6 February, Mujib boycotted the conference. On 21 February, the Six Points proposal was placed before the meeting of the working committee of the Awami League and the proposal was accepted unanimously.

The reason for proposing the Six Points was to give the East greater autonomy in Pakistan. Following the partition of India, the new state of Pakistan came into being. The inhabitants of East Pakistan (later Bangladesh) made up the majority of its population, and exports from East Pakistan (such as jute) were a majority of Pakistan's export income. However, East Pakistanis did not feel they had a proportional share of political power and economic benefits within Pakistan. A statistical overview of economic disc

East Pakistan was facing a critical situation after being subjected to continuous discrimination on a regional basis, year after year. As a result, the economists, intelligentsia, and the politicians of East Pakistan started to raise questions about this discrimination, giving rise to the historic six-point movement.

Draft of six-points
Rehman Sobhan, Nurul Islam, Khairul Kabir, and other prominent intellectuals drafted the six-point demand.

The six points

The six points are noted as being:

The Constitution should provide for a Federation of Pakistan in its true sense based on the Lahore Resolution, and the parliamentary form of government with supremacy of a Legislature directly elected on the basis of universal adult franchise.
The federal government should deal with only two subjects: Defence and Foreign Affairs, and all other residual subjects should be vested in the federating states.
Two separate, but freely convertible currencies for the two wings should be introduced; or if this is not feasible, there should be one currency for the whole country, but effective constitutional provisions should be introduced to stop the flight of capital from East to West Pakistan. Furthermore, a separate reserve bank should be established and separate fiscal and monetary policy be adopted for East Pakistan.
The power of taxation and revenue collection should be vested in the federating units and the federal centre would have no such power. The federation would be entitled to a share in the state taxes to meet its expenditures.
There should be two separate accounts for the foreign exchange earnings of the two wings; the foreign exchange requirements of the federal government should be met by the two wings equally or in a ratio to be fixed; indigenous products should move free of duty between the two wings, and the constitution should empower the units to establish trade links with foreign countries.
East Pakistan should have a separate military or paramilitary force, and Navy headquarters should be in East Pakistan.

Reception 
The proposal was rejected by politicians from West Pakistan and non Awami League politicians from East Pakistan. It was rejected by the president of the All Pakistan Awami League, Nawabzada Nasarullah Khan. It was also rejected by the National Awami Party, Jamaat-i-Islami, and Nizam-i-Islam. The movement had the support of the population of East Pakistan.

See also
 Bengali language movement

References

Causes and prelude of the Bangladesh Liberation War
Bangladesh Awami League
History of East Pakistan
Sheikh Mujibur Rahman
1966 in East Pakistan
1966 in Pakistan